Aljubarrota is a freguesia ("civil parish") in the municipality of Alcobaça, Portugal. It was formed in 2013 by the merger of the parishes of Prazeres and São Vicente. Its population in 2011 was 6,639 in an area of 47.94 km². In 1385 the Battle of Aljubarrota took place near the village.

Villages 

Aljubarrota
Ataíja de Baixo
Ataíja de Cima
Boavista
Cadoiço
Carrascal
Carvalhal
Casais de Santa Teresa
Casal da Eva
Casal do Rei
Chãos
Chiqueda
Covões
Cumeira de Baixo
Fonte do Ouro
Ganilhos
Lagoa do Cão
Lameira
Longras
Mogo e Quinta do Mogo
Moleanos
Olheiros e Quinta de S. Paio
Ponte de Jardim
Quinta da Cruz
Quinta Nova
Riba Fria
Val Vazão

See also
Battle of Aljubarrota

References

Freguesias of Alcobaça, Portugal